The 1859 Vermont gubernatorial election for governor of Vermont was held on Tuesday, September 6. In keeping with the "Mountain Rule", incumbent Republican Hiland Hall was a candidate for a second one-year term. The Democratic nominee was John Godfrey Saxe, former State's Attorney of Chittenden County.

Vermont's support for the Republican Party and the abolition of slavery remained strong, and Hall was easily re-elected. Hall took the oath of office for a one-year term that began on October 14.

General election

Results

References

1859
Vermont
Gubernatorial
October 1859 events